Mohammad Daud  is the name of:

Mohammed Daoud Khan (1909–1978), overthrew the last King of Afghanistan
Mohammed Daud Daud (1969–2011), Afghan soldier and politician
Mohammad Daud Sultanzoy (1952–2015), Afghan politician
Mohammad Daud Miraki (born 1967), Afghan writer and politician